Castanopsis microphylla is a tree in the family Fagaceae. The specific epithet  is from the Greek meaning "small-leaved".

Description
The bark is smooth, occasionally flaky.

Distribution and habitat
Castanopsis microphylla is endemic to Borneo. Its habitat is lowland dipterocarp to lower montane forests up to  altitude.

References

microphylla
Endemic flora of Borneo
Trees of Borneo
Plants described in 1968
Flora of the Borneo montane rain forests
Flora of the Borneo lowland rain forests